The EMD MP15, sometimes referenced as MP15DC, is a  switcher-type diesel locomotive model produced by General Motors' Electro-Motive Division between 1974-1980. It was equipped with an engine sporting a roots blower. The length was either  or  depending on the build date.

The early MP15 and the SW1500 were similar in appearance and applications. They were fitted with the same engine (a V12 EMD 12-645E) in a similar appearance. The primary difference is the MP15's standard Blomberg B trucks.

Development 
Switchers up to the SW1500 had been restricted to AAR type A switcher or Flexicoil lightweight trucks, both with a  wheelbase. In 1973 60 special order Mexico-only SW1504s were built on a slightly longer frame, allowing EMD's standard Blomberg B trucks, with a  wheelbase, to be used. The new model MP15DC  designation thus meant Multi-Purpose locomotive, 1500 hp, DC generator. Originally the locomotive was simply designated the MP15; the arrival of the alternator/rectifier MP15AC in 1975 changed the name.

With the success of the MP15, there was a demand for a model with an advanced AC drive system. The MP15AC replaced the MP15DC's DC generator with an alternator producing AC power which is converted to DC for the traction motors with a silicon rectifier. The MP15AC is  longer than an MP15DC, the extra space being needed for the rectifier equipment. The alternator-rectifier combination is more reliable than a generator, and this equipment became the standard for new diesel-electric locomotive designs.

The MP15AC is easily distinguished from the DC models. Instead of the front-mounted radiator intake and belt-driven fan used on all previous EMD switchers, these have intakes on the lower forward nose sides and electric fans. Side intakes allowed the unit to take in cooler air, and the electric fans improved a serious reliability issue found in its earlier DC sisters.

Engine 
The MP15 used a 12-cylinder version of the 645E series engine developing 1,500 hp at 900 rpm. Introduced in the SW1500, this was a 2-stroke, 45-degree V type, with a 9-inch bore by 10-inch stroke, giving 645 cubic inches displacement per cylinder. The 645 series, introduced in 1966, was EMD's standard engine through the 1980s.

See also
 List of GM-EMD locomotives

Notes

References 

 
 
 
 

B-B locomotives
MP15DC
Diesel-electric locomotives of the United States
Standard gauge locomotives of the United States
Standard gauge locomotives of Canada
Shunting locomotives